The following is a list of broadcasting licences for Category 2 Digital channels held by Ethnic Channels Group:

Launched (On the air)
 5 Kanal (Operates as exempt Cat. B Ethnic service)
 Aaj Tak (Hindi News)
 Abu Dhabi TV (Operates as exempt Cat. B Ethnic service)
 Al-Nahar TV (Operates as exempt Cat. B Ethnic service)
 Al-Nahar Drama (Operates as exempt Cat. B Ethnic service)
 Al-Resalah (Operates as exempt Cat. B Ethnic service)
 AMedia (Operates as exempt Cat. B Ethnic service)
 BBC Arabic (Operates as exempt Cat. B Ethnic service)
 beIN Sports (Operates as exempt Cat. B Ethnic service)
 Big Magic International (Hindi TV)
 CTC International (Operates as exempt Cat. B Ethnic service)
 Detskiy Kids (Operates as exempt Cat. B Ethnic service)
 Dream 2 (Operates as exempt Cat. B Ethnic service)
 FTV (Operates as exempt Cat. B Ethnic service)
 First National (Operates as exempt Cat. B Ethnic service)
 Greek Music Channel (Operates as exempt Cat. B Ethnic service)
 HRT Sat (Operates as exempt Cat. B Ethnic service)
 Hum TV (Operates as exempt Cat. B Ethnic service)
 Iran TV Network (Operates as exempt Cat. B Ethnic service)
 The Israeli Network (Operates as exempt Cat. B Ethnic service)
 KHL-TV HD (Operates as exempt Cat. B Ethnic service)
 Melody Aflam (Operates as exempt Cat. B Ethnic service)
 Melody Drama (Operates as exempt Cat. B Ethnic service)
 Melody Hits (Operates as exempt Cat. B Ethnic service)
 Momo Kids (Operates as exempt Cat. B Ethnic service)
 NGTV (Operates as exempt Cat. B Ethnic service)
 Nova World (Operates as exempt Cat. B Ethnic service)
 OSN Ya Hala International (Operates as exempt Cat. B Ethnic service)
 ProSiebenSat.1 Welt (Operates as exempt Cat. B Ethnic service)
 Rawal TV (Operates as exempt Cat. B Ethnic service)
 RBTi (Operates as exempt Cat. B Ethnic service)
 Rotana+ (Operates as exempt Cat. B Ethnic service)
 Rotana Aflam (Operates as exempt Cat. B Ethnic service)
 Rotana Cinema (Operates as exempt Cat. B Ethnic service)
 Rotana Classic (Operates as exempt Cat. B Ethnic service)
 Rotana Clip (Operates as exempt Cat. B Ethnic service)
 Rotana Khalijiah (Operates as exempt Cat. B Ethnic service)
 Rotana M+ (Operates as exempt Cat. B Ethnic service)
 Rotana Masriya (Operates as exempt Cat. B Ethnic service)
 Rotana Mousica (Operates as exempt Cat. B Ethnic service)
 RTL Living (Operates as exempt Cat. B Ethnic service)
 RTS Sat (Operates as exempt Cat. B Ethnic service)
 RTVi (Operates as exempt Cat. B Ethnic service)
 Russian Illuzion (Operates as exempt Cat. B Ethnic service)
 SBTN (Operates as exempt Cat. B Ethnic service)
 Schlager TV (Operates as exempt Cat. B Ethnic service)
 Sky News Arabia (Operates as exempt Cat. B Ethnic service)
 Ten Cricket (ECGL Cricket TV)
 Travelxp (Travel XP Canada)
 TVCentr International (Operates as exempt Cat. B Ethnic service)
 TVi International (Operates as exempt Cat. B Ethnic service)
 TVP Info (Operates as exempt Cat. B Ethnic service)
 Zee 24 Taas (Operates as exempt Cat. B Ethnic service)
 Zee Bangla (Operates as exempt Cat. B Ethnic service)
 ZEE Bollywood (Bollywood Movies TV)
 Zee Cinema (Bollywood SD - Hindi Movie Channel)
 Zee Marathi (Operates as exempt Cat. B Ethnic service)
 Zee Punjabi (Operates as exempt Cat. B Ethnic service)
 Zee Salaam (Operates as exempt Cat. B Ethnic service)
 Zee Talkies (Operates as exempt Cat. B Ethnic service)
 Zee Tamil (Operates as exempt Cat. B Ethnic service)
 Zee TV Canada (Hindi Women's TV)
 Zing (Hindi Music TV)

Former channels
 MEGA Cosmos (Greek TV 1)
 NTV Canada (Operates as exempt Cat. B Ethnic service)
 RTVi+ (Russian TV Two)
 Tonis (Ukrainian TV One)

Yet to launch

 South Asian News and Information TV
 Mandarin Children's TV
 South Asian Food TV
 Italian TV
 Hindi Women's TV 2

Did not launch (Licence has expired)

Arabic TV 2
Armenian TV
Bangladeshi/Bengali TV
Bulgarian TV
Caribbean TV
Chinese Movie Channel
Chinese News Channel
Chinese (Cantonese) Home TV Channel
Chinese (Mandarin) Entertainment TV
Chinese (Mandarin) Family TV Channel
Chinese/Taiwanese TV
Croatian TV
Czech TV
Dutch TV
Greek TV
Greek TV 2
Hindi/Urdu/Punjabi Movie Channel
Hungarian TV
Irish TV
Israeli TV 2
Norwegian TV
Pakistan TV
Polish News Channel
Polish TV
Portuguese/Brazil TV
Portuguese TV
Punjabi TV
Romanian TV
Russian TV 3
Russian TV 4
Serbian TV
Slovak TV
South Asian News Channel
Spanish Extreme Sport TV
Spanish Kids TV
Spanish Movie TV
Spanish Music TV
Sri Lanka TV
Swedish TV
Telugu TV
Urdu TV
Turkish TV
Ukrainian TV Two

Lists of television channels